is a Japanese model and gravure idol who is affiliated with Discovery Entertainment. She has a bachelor's degree in literature from Rikkyo University.

Filmography

TV series

References

External links
Official profile at Discovery Entertainment 
Official Ameba blog 
Official Twitter account (@yuki_mihara) 

Japanese female models
Japanese gravure models
1990 births
Living people
People from Higashiōsaka